John E. Nelson (born December 29, 1935) is an American politician who served as the 40th lieutenant governor of Nebraska from September 29, 2014 to January 8, 2015 under Governor Dave Heineman. He is a member of the Republican Party.

Born in Geneva, Nebraska, Nelson received his bachelor's degree from University of Nebraska–Lincoln and his law degree from Creighton University. He practiced law in Omaha, Nebraska.

He was elected to the Nebraska Legislature in 2006, representing Nebraska's 6th legislative district; Nelson served until he resigned to assume the lieutenant governorship. While a member of the state legislature, he served on the Appropriations Committee and; in 2009, State Senator Nelson was elected Vice-Chairman of the Executive Board by a 33 to 15 margin.

References

1935 births
Living people
People from Geneva, Nebraska
Creighton University alumni
University of Nebraska–Lincoln alumni
Nebraska lawyers
Lieutenant Governors of Nebraska
Republican Party Nebraska state senators